TNV may refer to:
 Tanchangya language
 Times New Viking, an American band
 Tobacco necrosis virus
 Tripura National Volunteers, a defunct nationalist militant group in India